Dhalbhum was the name given to parganas Supur and Ambikanagar in the Khatra area of present Bankura district in the Indian state of West Bengal. In the course of time, Dhalbhum kingdom was spread over a much wider area, across the western part of adjoining Midnapore district and the eastern and south-eastern parts of Singhbhum district in present-day Jharkhand.

History
According to tradition, the original Raja of Dhalbhum was Chintamoni Dhoba, a person of Rajak caste. The pai or grain measure used in these parganas was for a long time called Chintaman pai. Legend goes on to say that Dhalbhum was wrested from him by Jagannath Deb of Dholpur in Rajputana. After 32 generations Supur Raj, as it was locally called, was divided in consequence of a disputed succession. One of the successors continued at Supur and the other shifted to Ambikanagar. Both the families were related to the families of Bishnupur, Raipur, Shyamsundarpur and others. They ruled for about 700 years. A branch of the same family ruled in Chikligarh or Jamboni.

Rankini Devi is established as the family goddess of the Dhalbhum rulers. It is said that human sacrifice was offered to the goddess every year,

Dhalbhumgarh

Dhalbhumgarh is a community development block in East Singhbhum district, in Jharkhand where it borders West Bengal and Orissa. The town is on NH 33. There is a railway station.

References

Bankura district
Paschim Medinipur district
East Singhbhum district